Thomas Withers Chinn (November 20, 1791 – May 22, 1852) was a member of the U. S. House of Representatives representing the state of Louisiana, serving one term as a Whig from 1839 to 1841.  

He was also U.S. minister to the Two Sicilies.

Biography 
Chinn was born in Cynthiana, Kentucky, in Harrison County and later moved to Louisiana.

Death 
He died on his plantation in West Baton Rouge Parish. He is now buried in Magnolia Cemetery in Baton Rouge.

External links 
Bio at Congress.gov
Political Graveyard

1791 births
1852 deaths
Whig Party members of the United States House of Representatives from Louisiana
19th-century American politicians